Cherry Hill Road is a common road name in English-speaking places, including:
Cherry Hill Road (Calverton–College Park, Maryland)
Cherry Hill Road (Baltimore)
Cherry Hill Road (Reisterstown, Maryland)
Cherry Hill Road (Philippi, West Virginia)
Cherry Hill Road (Parsippany, New Jersey), exit 42 off Interstate 80

See also
Cherry Hill (disambiguation)